Gertrude Aston Thimelby (1617–1668) was an English poet and author, who became a Roman Catholic nun late in life.

Life
One of the 10 children of Sir Walter Aston of Tixall and Colton (Staffordshire), later Baron of Forfor, a British diplomat, and his wife, Gertrude (née Sadlier), Gertrude Aston wrote poetry as a member of a Catholic literary circle, now known as the "Astons of Tixall". In 1620 her father went to Spain on an embassy, taking his wife and children with him. Sir Walter stayed in Spain for six years, where he converted to Roman Catholicism. 
 
In 1645 she married Henry Thimelby from a large recusant family, whose sister Katherine was also a poet, was the wife of Gertrude's brother, Herbert. In 1658, after the deaths of her husband and only child, Gertrude became a nun at St. Monica's Convent, Louvain, where her sister-in-law, Winefrid Thimelby, a notable letter-writer, was the Prioress. Sister Gertrude died in 1668. The Aston and Thimelby families and their literary circle exchanged and collected manuscript poems and letters, known today through the volumes edited by their descendants.

References

Links

 The Aston-Thimelby circle at home and abroad: localism, national identity and internationalism in the English Catholic community
 Blackwell Reference Online/Subject Literature » Renaissance Literature (DOI: 10.1111/b.9781405194495.2012.x)    
 Profile of Gertrude Aston Thimelby

1617 births
1668 deaths
17th-century English Roman Catholic nuns
English women poets
English expatriates in Belgium
Daughters of barons
People from the Borough of Stafford
Place of birth missing